Goian (Hoiany, Goiany) is a commune in Transnistria, Moldova. It is composed of two villages, Goian and Iagorlîc (Ягорлик, Ягорлык). It has since 1990 been administered as a part of the breakaway Pridnestrovian Moldovan Republic (PMR).

References

Communes of Transnistria
Kherson Governorate
Dubăsari District, Transnistria